Suçatı is a village in Mut district of Mersin Province, Turkey. Population of Suçatı was 563 as of 2012. Olive production and cattle breeding are the main economic activities of the village.

References

Villages in Mut District